Homalocalyx staminosus is a member of the family Myrtaceae endemic to Western Australia.

Description
It blooms between July and September producing pink-purple-red flowers.

Ecology
It is found on rocky sandstone ridges in a scattered area in the northern Mid West and Pilbara regions of Western Australia where it grows in shallow soils.

References

staminosus
Endemic flora of Western Australia
Myrtales of Australia
Rosids of Western Australia
Plants described in 1987
Taxa named by Ferdinand von Mueller